Maidnappers is an adventure story arc of the Philippine comic strip series Pugad Baboy, created by Pol Medina Jr. and originally published in the Philippine Daily Inquirer. This particular story arc lasts 88 strips. It is one of the three longest Pugad Baboy story arcs, the others being Aso and "The Bourne Ambrosity".  In 1994, the story arc was reprinted in PB5, the fifth book compilation of the comic strip series. Maidnapper is a portmanteau of the words "maid" and "kidnapper".

Synopsis
Tiny, Bab and Polgas arrive at Ninoy Aquino International Airport to meet her Filipino-American cousin Gwen. Gwen is accompanied by Gloria, her Cebuana nanny, who takes an instant liking to Bab, much to his discomfiture and makes a few attempts to get a kiss from him, which he answers with a kick to the chin. Later that evening, Bab serenades Gwen with help from Joboy and Polgas. Tiny and Gloria tell Gwen that she's supposed to pour a bucket of water on the singers; unfamiliar with Filipino customs, Gwen complies.

In the succeeding days of her stay, Gwen is immersed in Filipino culture; she is exposed to potholed streets, frequently changed street names, exotic native dishes, including Dagul's "Soup Number Five", Filipino movies (which she calls "typically third world"), discusses the merits of communism with Noli, and marvels at the capacity of Filipinos to eat each and every part of the chicken. After being jokingly told by Tiny that the local siopao she had consumed had cat meat in it, she vows to eat nothing but chicken for the rest of her stay.

Maid's day out
Temporarily freed from their duties, Brosia and Glo look for a gay bar somewhere along Timog Avenue, with the intention of viewing a Chippendales-style show. Upon entering the bar, the duo run into Debbie and Barbie, who had mistakenly entered the gay bar, thinking it was a restaurant. After exchanging threats of exposure, but later agreeing to keep the incident to themselves, each pair decide to leave but Brosia and Glo stays instead. Glo uses Gwen's Gold card to pay for the bar services; Chipper, their waiter, mistakenly tags them as prospective prey for his kidnap-for-ransom gang upon seeing Gwen's name on the card. Two of the gang's members, Demet and Tangwel, abduct the two and bring them to a safehouse. The kidnappers later call the Sungcal household, demanding a million pesos for the safe return of "Gwendolynne Dobson". After seeing Gwen safe and sound, the Sungcals determine that it is the maids who had been kidnapped.

Ransom
The Sungcals amass the ransom money by selling expensive personal belongings. When their pool amounts only to PHP312,000, an anonymous donor sends them Php 688,000.00 to complete the amount. Gwen also objects to the ransom payments, as she could not fathom why the family would want to risk money for two househelps.

While the ransom is being pooled, Polgas secretly goes to the wishing well in his master's garden and uses the cleverly disguised well to gain access to the Dog Cave, where he changes to his Dobermaxx persona. Using the Dog Cave's computer, he traces the location of the last transaction on Gwen's credit card. He pretends to be an erotic dancer in need of a job and penetrates the gay bar's inner circle. He soon sets his sights on Chipper and later kidnaps him for interrogation. He learns that the gang's safehouse was somewhere deep in Fort Santiago. As he tunnels through the old fort, Dobermaxx accidentally discovers the treasure Charles McDougal and his team had been looking for in the 1980s; Dobermaxx marks the spot with an electronic tracer. He soon locates the gang's safehouse and only chances upon Tangwel; Brosia and Glo are nowhere to be found. Dobermaxx hangs Tangwel from the ceiling and makes him talk; Tangwel says Demet left to collect the ransom money from Dagul. Dobermaxx leaves the safehouse to warn Dagul as the fort's concrete blocks signals from his satellite phone, but receives a call from Tiny telling him that the kidnappers were demanding another million.

Dobermaxx to the rescue
Dobermaxx notices that Tangwel was playing Bab's guitar and wearing Dagul's wristwatch, concluding that the kidnappers bought all the personal possessions the Sungcals had sold in their desperation to raise the ransom money. Dobermaxx takes Tangwel to the Sungcal residence and uses the Thunderdog's on-board computer to determine the location of "buy-and-sell" joints in the immediate vicinity, which he suspected was a front for a fencing operation run by the kidnappers. With the data in hand, Dobermaxx ejects from the speeding Thunderdog and deploys his delta-wing glider. He soon spots Dagul's car in one of the "buy-and-sell" joints. Detaching himself from the glider, Dobermaxx deploys Gary, his flea-bot, to act as a spotter.

Gary enters the premises and sees several goons, including Chipper, in the living area; Demet, Brosia and Glo, together with two more kidnap victims, are in the basement. Dobermaxx transmits the hide-out's location to Dagul and attacks the place. Using his ballistic arnis, bolas and garapata gun, Dobermaxx takes down several of the goons before Demet and another cohort appears with Glo and Brosia as hostages. They force Dobermaxx to drop his weapon, before they open fire on him. At this point, Dagul and Bab arrives, disabling Demet and the second goon. Chipper, however, has the upper hand as he covers Dagul and Bab with a firearm. With perfect timing, Tomas and Noli arrives to subdue Chipper. Tangwel grabs Noli's revolver, but was in turn subdued by the policeman Gwen had summoned. The kidnappers then try to fool the cop into taking their side (with the "logic" that police officers were as equally guilty as criminals, as per the public's view of Filipino police officers), but the cop would have none of it in the end.

Dobermaxx soon turns up with the cop's partner, whom he had convinced to return from the domestic airport with the ransom money. Dobermaxx's Amstac mesh vest (and his fat) had saved his life. Everyone waits for the anti-crime czar, "Kraymbuster" to make an appearance before the gang was booked, for the purpose of a media publicity stunt.

It is later revealed that the anonymous donor was no other than Gwen.

Epilogue
At a party held some time after the incident, Gwen and Gloria reconcile with each other (Gwen, for not valuing her nanny enough to save her life, and Gloria, for messing with her ward's things without permission, which was the cause of the entire fiasco in the first place.). Gwen understands the Filipino family value that even maids are considered part of the household and that children always take care of their parents in their old age ("That's why you rarely see our parents in nursing homes", Tiny quips). When it is time for the two to leave and goodbyes are to be said, Gwen finally proclaims to be proud of her Filipino heritage to Tiny and unexpectedly gives Bab a goodbye kiss on the lips, which he enjoys. When Gloria appears to want a goodbye kiss from Bab, he gives her a chance since she's leaving anyway. However, Glo suddenly kicks him upwards, thus getting revenge.

Meanwhile, Dobermaxx delivers 64,000 pieces of 900-troy ounce gold bullion as full payment for the Philippines foreign debt of US$29.189 billion (in 1992 figures) to Mother Teresa, who acts as his go-between, since he did not wish for his identity to be known. The gold haul was implied to be the Dobermaxx found in Fort Santiago. He also does the payment anonymously to effectively bypass government law of giving 10% of the find to the National Treasury and keep the treasure off the hands of corrupt officials (such as Senator Cabalfin, who unwittingly said that the bullion should go to his pocket before correcting himself). Shortly after, Mother Teresa arrives in the Philippines to start a fund for calamity victims using the staggering but still enormous amount from the gold. While Dagul and Polgas watch the news reports of these matters, despite the obviousness of the featured silhouette, Dagul asks Polgas his opinion on who the mystery benefactor was, to which the dog convincingly feigns indifference to such matters, effectively keeping his actions with the gold secret.

Real-life references
 Included in Bab, Joboy, and Polgas' repertoire during their serenade of Gwen are My Prayer by The Platters, Wonderful Tonight by Eric Clapton, Thriller by Michael Jackson and Aquarius/Let the Sunshine In by The 5th Dimension. "Thriller" kicks in when Glo shows up at the window.
 Dagul's and Debbie's wristwatches are a TAG Heuer and a Baume et Mercier, respectively.
 Charles McDougal was a former member of the United States Army Special Forces who did extensive excavation in Fort Santiago and on Corregidor in the 1980s, looking for the Yamashita treasure.
Pol Medina, Jr. used this story arc to launch a contest wherein the participants were required to answer a question on an observation made regarding the 52nd strip of the series; the contestants mailed their answers to the author. Winners were given Polgas P-shirts as prizes.
 The Kraymbuster (Crimebuster) parodies then Philippine Vice-President Joseph Estrada, who headed the Presidential Anti-Crime Commission. 
 Glo and Brosia's kidnappers thought that Gwen was the daughter of an American soldier stationed at the Subic Naval Base. The Americans were already on the closing stages of their withdrawal from the Philippines at the time the story arc was published.
 Polgas' stage name as an erotic dancer is Gardog Verzosa, a play on the name of Filipino movie actor Gardo Versoza, who started his career in soft-core porn movies.
 Rescued along with Brosia and Glo were brothers Maipainetapasia and Maisuklaipamandin Uy. The names of the two brothers are a reference to the Filipino folk song Paru-Parong Bukid (Butterflies in the Field). May payneta pa siya--uy! and May suklay pa man din--uy! are two verses of the song.
 Gwen's nickname is "Pookie", which makes the love-struck Bab blush, as the pronunciation of the word is a reference to the vulgar Filipino term puke (vagina).
 Gwen's dousing of water on Bab, Joboy, and Polgas during their serenade is an informal Filipino custom of rejecting a suitor.

Notes

Pugad Baboy